Dream Walker may refer to:

Dream Walker (comic), a Singaporean comic
Kulipari: Dream Walker, the second season of the animated television series
The Dream Walker, a 2014 album by Angels & Airwaves

See also
Dreamwalker (disambiguation)